VfL Osnabrück Basketball was the basketball department of the multi-sports club VfL Osnabrück based in Osnabrück, Lower Saxony, Germany.

Honours
Basketball Bundesliga
Champions (1): 1968–69
Runners-up (2): 1966–67, 1967–68
German Cup
Champions (1): 1967
Runners-up (2): 1969, 1970

References

B
Defunct basketball teams in Germany
Sport in Lower Saxony
Sport in Osnabrück